Desert Gold is a 1919 American silent Western film directed by T. Hayes Hunter and starring E.K. Lincoln, Margery Wilson and Eileen Percy. It is based on the novel of the same title by Zane Grey.

Cast
 E.K. Lincoln as Dick Gale
 Margery Wilson as Mercedes Castenada
 Eileen Percy as Nell
 Lawson Butt as The Yaqui 
 Russell Simpson as Ladd
 Walter Long as Rojas
 Edward Coxen as Captain George Thorne
 Frank Brownlee as Jonas Warren
 Arthur Morrison as Lash
 Jeanne Carpenter as Jeanne Carpenter
 Beulah Dark Cloud as Papago Indian Mother 
 Mary Jane Irving as The Child
 Frank Lanning as Papago Indian Son
 Laura Winston as Mrs. Belding
 W.H. Bainbridge as Jim Belding

References

Bibliography
 Goble, Alan. The Complete Index to Literary Sources in Film. Walter de Gruyter, 1999.

External links
 

1919 films
1919 Western (genre) films
1910s English-language films
American black-and-white films
Films directed by T. Hayes Hunter
Films distributed by W. W. Hodkinson Corporation
Pathé Exchange films
Films based on American novels
Films based on works by Zane Grey
Silent American Western (genre) films
1910s American films